is a Japanese light novel series written by Kugane Maruyama and illustrated by so-bin. It began serialization online in 2010, before being acquired by Enterbrain. Sixteen volumes have been published since July 2012. A manga adaptation by Satoshi Ōshio, with art by Hugin Miyama, began serialization in Kadokawa Shoten's manga magazine Comp Ace from November 26, 2014. Both the light novels and the manga are licensed in North America by Yen Press since 2016.

The novel has been adapted into an anime television series adaptation by Madhouse, consisting of four seasons with thirteen episodes each, with the first season airing from July to September 2015. Two compilation anime films recapping the events from the first season were released in Japan in February and March 2017, respectively. The second season ran from January to April 2018, the third season ran from July to October 2018, and the fourth season ran from July to September 2022. An anime film has been announced.

Plot

In 2126, a Full-Dive Massively multiplayer online role-playing game or DMMORPG called YGGDRASIL was released, standing out among all other DMMORPGs due to its unusually high ability for the player to interact with the game. After an intense twelve-year run, the game servers are about to be shut down. Within the game exists a guild, Ainz Ooal Gown, once consisting of 41 members and credited as one of the strongest guilds in the game. Now only four of the members remain, the other 37 having quit the game, and only one, a skeletal Lich "Overlord" character named Momonga, continues to play as the guild leader, maintaining their headquarters in The Great Tomb of Nazarick. In the minutes before the shutdown he invites the remaining guild members, but of those only one appears and only for a short while before leaving. While saddened by this, he accepts the reality that his friends have their other lives to take care of and decides to stay logged in until the servers shut down.

When the shut-down time arrives, Momonga discovers that the game hasn't vanished; instead, it appears as if Nazarick has been transported to another world altogether and its various NPCs becoming actual living beings. Momonga has been trapped in the form of his game avatar, leaving him unable to use the normal player functions such as General Message, or even log out. With no other option, Momonga sets out to learn if any players like himself are in this new world. Taking on the name of the guild, Ainz Ooal Gown, as a message to any other remaining players, Momonga begins exploring the world in an attempt to figure out what has happened while searching for anyone or anything that could help him solve this mystery, while ensuring the safety of Nazarick. Ainz Ooal Gown seems to have modifications made to his behavior by in-game mechanics, because he demonstrates no moral qualms with killing and other actions that are taboo in the real world. This is a story about the psychology of a creature with near-limitless power who is beyond ethical concerns.

Media

Light novels
The light novel series written by Maruyama, with illustrations by so-bin, began its serialization online in 2010 via the novel publishing website Arcadia. It was also uploaded to the novel publishing website Shōsetsuka ni Narō in 2012, prior to Enterbrain's acquisition. As of July 29, 2022, the series has been published by Enterbrain in sixteen volumes, with the first volume releasing on July 30, 2012, and the sixteenth volume releasing on July 29, 2022. Yen Press announced its license to the series in October 2015 for North America and began publishing the novels in English, with the first volume releasing on May 24, 2016. Maruyama has stated that the series will end at its seventeenth volume. In the afterword in the second part of the 16th volume it was announced by the author that the series will end at its eighteenth volume.

|}

Manga
A manga adaptation by Satoshi Ōshio, with art by Hugin Miyama, began serialization in Kadokawa Shoten's manga magazine Comp Ace from November 26, 2014.

Anime

A 13-episode anime television series adaptation by Madhouse aired between July 7 and September 29, 2015. The opening theme is "Clattanoia" by OxT, and the ending theme is "L.L.L." by Myth & Roid. Both are bands of the musician Tom-H@ck. The anime adaptation covers light novel volumes 1 to 3. A 30-minute original video animation was bundled with the eleventh limited edition volume of the light novel series, which was released on September 30, 2016. Two compilation films acting as a recap to the anime television series were released in 2017; the first compilation film, titled , was released on February 25, 2017, while the second compilation film, titled , was released on March 11, 2017. The films' theme song, titled "Crazy Scary Holy Fantasy", was performed by Myth & Roid.

A second season was announced at film screenings of the second compilation film. It premiered on January 9, 2018. It ran for a total of 13 episodes. Outside of Asia, Funimation has licensed the second season for a simuldub. Following Sony's acquisition of Crunchyroll, the series was moved to Crunchyroll. In South and Southeast Asia, Medialink holds the rights to the series. The opening theme is "Go Cry Go" by OxT and the ending theme is "Hydra" by Myth & Roid. The second season of the anime adaptation covers light novel volumes 4 to 6.

A third season premiered on July 10, 2018. The opening theme is "VORACITY" by Myth & Roid, and the ending theme song is "Silent Solitude" by OxT. With 13 episodes as with the previous seasons, the third season of the anime adaptation covers light novel volumes 7 to 9.

On May 8, 2021, a fourth season and an anime film were announced, with the film covering the Holy Kingdom Arc of the series. The staff and cast members returned to reprise their roles for the fourth season, which aired from July 5 to September 27, 2022. The opening theme is "HOLLOW HUNGER" by OxT, and the ending theme is "No Man's Dawn" by Mayu Maeshima. On July 18, 2022, Crunchyroll announced an English dub for the fourth season, which began streaming on July 19. The fourth season covers light novel volumes 10, 11 and 14, while the movie adapts volumes 12 and 13.

A comedy crossover anime, Isekai Quartet featured characters from Overlord in a Chibi style, much like the OVA. It also featured characters from the light novel series KonoSuba, Re:Zero − Starting Life in Another World, and The Saga of Tanya the Evil, all published by Kadokawa Corporation. The anime began airing on April 9, 2019.

Games 
A mobile game Mass for the Dead was launched in late 2019 in Japan, with a global (English) version launched in early 2020. It received poor reviews, with reviewers noting it was rather simple and did not offer anything new compared to many other similar gacha games. The global version has been shut down as of March 31, 2021.

A Metroidvania game titled Overlord: Escape from Nazarick was announced on December 17, 2021, for Nintendo Switch and PC via Steam and was released on June 16, 2022.

Reception
In June 2015, prior to the release of the anime and manga, the light novel series had about 600,000 copies in print in Japan with eight volumes. By August 1, 2015, the light novel and manga series had a total of 1 million copies in circulation in Japan. On August 4, a 600,000-copy reprint of the novels was announced. As of August 20, 2015, the nine-volume Overlord light novel series and two-volume manga series have, together, more than 1.5 million copies in circulation in Japan. As of September 18, 2015, Overlord light novel and manga has over 2 million copies in circulation. As of May 2016, the Overlord light novel series had 2.5 million copies in print. Overlord has since been named the top-selling light novel series of 2015. As of April 2018, the light novel and manga combined had over 7 million copies in print.

The light novel ranked first in 2017 in Takarajimasha's annual light novel guide book Kono Light Novel ga Sugoi!, in the tankōbon category. It ranked fourth in 2018.

In reviewing the anime adaptation, Kotaku called the Overlord anime a "magnificent power fantasy" which "brings up a very relatable theme for anyone who has played an MMORPG before."

Notes

References

External links
  
  
 

2012 Japanese novels
Anime and manga based on light novels
Book series introduced in 2012
Dark fantasy anime and manga
Enterbrain
Fictional guilds
Crunchyroll anime
Isekai anime and manga
Isekai novels and light novels
Japanese fantasy novels
Kadokawa Shoten manga
Kadokawa Dwango franchises
Light novels
Light novels first published online
Madhouse (company)
Madman Entertainment anime
Massively multiplayer online role-playing games in fiction
Medialink
Novels set in the 22nd century
Seinen manga
Shōsetsuka ni Narō
Studio Puyukai
Yen Press titles
Norse mythology in anime and manga